This is a list of the universities in Finland. Institutions of higher education are designated as universities by Finnish legislation. Only universities have the right to confer degrees in the categories of alempi korkeakoulututkinto/lägre högskoleexamen (bachelor's degree) and ylempi korkeakoulututkinto/högre högskoleexamen (master's degree) and doctoral degrees.

In addition to the universities, Finland has another, separate system of tertiary education consisting of the ammattikorkeakoulus/yrkeshögskolas, which used to be translated as polytechnics but now call themselves universities of applied sciences according to international usage (see the list of polytechnics in Finland). The universities of applied sciences have the right to confer degrees in the categories of ammattikorkeakoulututkinto/yrkeshögskoleexamen and ylempi ammattikorkeakoulututkinto/högre yrkeshögskoleexamen. In international usage, these degrees have the same names as those conferred by Finnish (normal) universities, i.e. bachelor's and master's degrees.

Universities

Multidisciplinary universities 
The Finnish universities are (sorted by the year of establishment):

Specialized universities 

In Finland, there are also some institutions of higher education that have full university status, but which specialize in certain academic fields:

The National Defence University is not considered a university by Finnish law, although it has the authority to award bachelor's, master's and doctoral degrees and to pursue free research, and its rector is a member of the Council of Finnish University rectors. The practical effect of this distinction is minor, and most notable in the administrative organization of the university, which is military instead of civilian.

See also 
University Admissions Finland
List of polytechnics in Finland
List of colleges and universities
List of colleges and universities by country
List of schools in Finland

References

Universities
Finland
Finland
Universities